Sir Thomas Clarke  (1703 – 13 November 1764) was a British judge who served as Master of the Rolls. He was the son of a carpenter and a pawnbroker from St Giles in the Fields, and was educated at Westminster School between 1715 and 1721 thanks to the help of Zachary Pearce. On 10 June 1721 he matriculated to Trinity College, Cambridge, graduating with a BA in 1724. He became a fellow of Trinity College in 1727, and a member of Gray's Inn the same year. Clarke was evidently knowledgeable in Roman law, and was mentioned in a poem called the causidicade as a possible Solicitor General in 1742. He became a King's Counsel (KC) in 1740, and in 1742 left Gray's Inn to join Lincoln's Inn, which he became a bencher of in 1754.

In 1747 he was elected a Member of Parliament for St Michael's, and in 1754 was returned for Lostwithiel. After the death of the Master of the Rolls, Sir John Strange, Clarke was offered the position. The job was originally offered to William Murray, later Lord Mansfield, but he turned it down. If he had accepted, Clarke might instead have succeeded Murray as Attorney General for England and Wales. Clarke was officially appointed on 25 May 1754, and was knighted at the same time. In June 1754 he was invested as a Privy Councillor (PC). Clarke evidently discharged his duties "with great credit" for ten years, until his death in office on 13 November 1764. He was buried in the Rolls Chapel, now the main library of King's College London.

Clarke was a close friend of the second Earl of Macclesfield, and this friendship combined with his unclear parentage started rumours that Clark was in fact Macclesfield's son. "He left a large fortune behind him, which he had acquired solely by the practice of his profession, the greater part of it being bequeathed by him to the third earl of Macclesfield, the grandson of his old benefactor." In his will, Clarke left his Flitcroft-designed home, Branch Hill Lodge, to Macclesfield. Outside politics and law, Clarke was a Fellow of the Royal Society (FRS), and "devoted himself to philosophical pursuits".

References

Bibliography

1703 births
1764 deaths
Masters of the Rolls
People educated at Westminster School, London
Alumni of Trinity College, Cambridge
Fellows of Trinity College, Cambridge
Members of Gray's Inn
Members of Lincoln's Inn
Members of the Parliament of Great Britain for constituencies in Cornwall
British MPs 1747–1754
British MPs 1754–1761
Fellows of the Royal Society
British King's Counsel
Members of the Privy Council of Great Britain